The pygmy mouse lemur (Microcebus myoxinus), also known as Peters' mouse lemur or dormouse lemur, is a primate weighing only ; it is the second smallest of the mouse lemurs. Its dorsal side is a rufous-brown colour, and creamy-white ventrally. It lives in dry deciduous forests of western Madagascar. It has been captured in the Tsingy de Bemaraha Nature Reserve, the Andramasy forests north of Belo sur Tsiribihina, and the border of heavily degraded deciduous forest and savanna at Aboalimena. It has also been found in other habitats, in mangroves in two localities.

Accounts and descriptions of this species are frequently confounded with those of Microcebus berthae, the smallest primate in the world. This is because specimens of M. berthae captured in Kirindy Forest, 60 km north of Morondava, were erroneously named M. myoxinus. Apparently, the rufous color of M. berthae (not described at the time) matched the description by Peter as M. myoxinus. Most articles on the web report information on M. myoxinus that correspond to studies made in Kirindy Forest on M. berthae.

The behavior and ecology of Microcebus myoxinus remains to be studied in the wild.

References

Mouse lemurs
Mammals described in 1852
Taxa named by Wilhelm Peters